Tim Crosbie is an Australian visual effects supervisor.

He was nominated for the Best Visual Effects at the 87th Academy Awards for his work on the film X-Men: Days of Future Past. His nomination was shared with Richard Stammers, Lou Pecora, and Cameron Waldbauer. He is part of Rising Sun Pictures production team which does visual effects.

References

External links

Living people
Special effects people
Year of birth missing (living people)
Place of birth missing (living people)